Shashin Dilranga (born 28 November 1994) is a Sri Lankan cricketer. He made his first-class debut for Burgher Recreation Club in the 2016–17 Premier League Tournament on 6 January 2017. He made his Twenty20 debut for Burgher Recreation Club in the 2017–18 SLC Twenty20 Tournament on 24 February 2018. He made his List A debut for Burgher Recreation Club in the 2017–18 Premier Limited Overs Tournament on 10 March 2018.

References

External links
 

1994 births
Living people
Sri Lankan cricketers
Burgher Recreation Club cricketers
Cricketers from Colombo